Berthelinia chloris, also known as the green sapsucker, is a species of sea snail with a shell comprising two separate hinged pieces or valves. It is a marine gastropod mollusc in the family Juliidae.

Distribution
This species is found in the eastern Pacific.
The type locality for this species is Baja California, Western Mexico.

References

 Abbott R. T. (1974). American Seashells. The marine mollusca of the Atlantic and Pacific coast of North America. II edit. Van Nostrand, New York 663 p. + 24 pl: page(s): 341

Juliidae
Gastropods described in 1918